Harriet Evans Martin (died 1846) was an Anglo-Irish novelist. 

Born Harriet Evans, she was the daughter of Hugh Evans, senior surgeon of the 5th Dragoon Guards. George Evans, 4th Baron Carbery may have been a paternal relative, as she dedicated one of her books to him.

Her first marriage, c. 1788, was to Captain Robert Hesketh, R.N., by whom she had no issue. In May 1794 she remarried to Richard Martin MP (1754–1834), by whom she had three daughters and a son. One of her children, Harriet Letitia Martin, would herself become a noted writer.

Martin established her reputation with the publication of her Remarks in 1802, a well-regarded critical study on the performances of stage actor John Philip Kemble (1757–1823).

Bibliography
 Historic tales. A novel, Dublin, 1788
 Remarks on ... J. Kemble's performance of Hamlet and Richard III, London, 1802
 Helen of Glenross. A novel, London, 1802

References
 The King of Connemara, Shevaun Lynham, Lilliput Press, Dublin, 1975
 A Guide to Irish Fiction 1650–1900, Lober, Lober and Burnham, Four Courts Press, Dublin, 2008

Irish writers
Irish women writers
People from County Tipperary
1846 deaths
Year of birth unknown
19th-century Irish people